Celebrate Freedom is a 1984 album by virtuoso trumpeter and singer Phil Driscoll. It is an inspirational album of patriotic songs. The album won the 1985 GMA Dove Award for Instrumental Album of the Year. The 1984 release was on LP, and the album was released on cassette and CD in the 1990s.

Cross Rhythms review of the album stated that "On Celebrate Freedom Phil puts down some vocals as well as his already well established 'Miles Davis eat your heart out' trumpet style." The UK publication also noted Driscoll's "Joe Cocker-ish approach to blue-eyed soul singing".

Track listing
"The Star-Spangled Banner" - 2:29
"America the Beautiful" - 4:07
"Battle Hymn of the Republic" - 6:36
"Statue of Liberty" (Neil Enole) - 6:22
"God of Our Fathers" - 6:00
"I Love America" (Driscoll) - 3:10
"We Are His People" (Driscoll) - 6:02
"Land of the Free" (Driscoll) - 4:00
"America" (Driscoll) - 4:04
"E Pluribus Unum" (Driscoll) - 7:11

Personnel 
 Phil Driscoll – vocals, trumpet, flugelhorn, arrangements
 Lari Goss – keyboards, backing vocals 
 Harlan Rogers – keyboards, organ
 Joe Hardy – guitars
 Hadley Hockensmith – guitars
 Ricky Keller – bass
 Jim Keltner – drums
 James Robertson – congas, timbales
 London National Philharmonic Orchestra – orchestra
 Terry Blackwood – backing vocals
 William C. Brown – backing vocals
 Duncan Sisters – backing vocals 
 Roni Goss – backing vocals 
 Sharon Scott – backing vocals 
 Melodie Tunney – backing vocals 
 The Christ Missionary Baptist Church Choir – choir 

Production
 Phil Driscoll – producer, mixing 
 Lari Goss – producer, mixing 
 Joe Hardy – engineer, mixing 
 Mike Ross-Trevor – mixing 
 Richard Hollywood – mix assistant 
 Steve Hall – mastering 
 Ken Pennell – mastering

References

External links
Celebrate Freedom at AllMusic
Celebrate Freedom at iTunes

1984 albums
Phil Driscoll albums
Sparrow Records albums